Wexner is a surname. Notable people with the surname include:

 Les Wexner (born 1937), American businessman
 Steven D. Wexner, American surgeon and physician

See also
 Wexner Center for the Arts
 Wexler (surname)

Jewish surnames
German-language surnames